Movement for the Recovery of the PCE (in Spanish: Movimiento para la Recuperación del PCE, MR-PCE) was a political party in Spain. Formed in 1982 by ex-members of the Communist Party of Spain and Comisiones Obreras that wanted a more pro-soviet and orthodox leninist political line.

In 1984 MR-PCE created the Communist Party of the Peoples of Spain, with Unified Communist Party of Spain and other smaller pro-soviet parties.

References

Communist parties in Spain
Political parties established in 1982
1982 establishments in Spain
Political parties disestablished in 1984
1984 disestablishments in Spain